Invasion stripes were alternating black and white bands painted on the fuselages and wings of Allied aircraft during World War II to reduce the chance that they would be attacked by friendly forces during and after the Normandy Landings. Three white and two black bands were wrapped around the rear of a fuselage just in front of the empennage (tail) and from front to back around the upper and lower wing surfaces.

After a study concluded that the thousands of aircraft involved in the invasion would saturate and break down the IFF system, the marking scheme was approved on May 17, 1944, by Air Chief Marshal Sir Trafford Leigh-Mallory, commanding the Allied Expeditionary Air Force. A small-scale test exercise was flown over the OVERLORD invasion fleet on June 1, to familiarise the ships' crews with the markings, but for security reasons, orders to paint the stripes were not issued to the troop carrier units until June 3 and to the fighter and bomber units until June 4.

Stripes were applied to fighters, photo-reconnaissance aircraft, troop carriers, twin-engined medium and light bombers, and some special duty aircraft. They were not painted on four-engined heavy bombers of the U.S. Eighth Air Force or RAF Bomber Command, as there was little chance of mistaken identity, the Luftwaffe having few such bombers (the Heinkel He 177 and Focke-Wulf Fw 200 Condor being the exceptions). The order affected all aircraft of the Allied Expeditionary Air Force, the Air Defence of Great Britain, gliders, and support aircraft such as Coastal Command air-sea rescue aircraft whose duties might entail their overflying Allied anti-aircraft defenses. 

One month after D-Day, the stripes were ordered removed from planes' upper surfaces to make them more difficult to spot on the ground at forward bases in France. They were completely removed by the end of 1944 after the Allies achieved total air supremacy over France.

During Operation Dragoon, two wings of IX Troop Carrier Command were sent to Italy to reinforce troop carrier forces in the Mediterranean Theater of Operations.  Invasion stripes were painted on the aircraft of the 51st Troop Carrier Wing, already stationed there, to provide uniform markings during the operation.

World War II

Marking description

The stripes were five alternating black and white stripes. National markings and serial number were not to be obliterated. However, American aircraft using the invasion stripes very commonly had some part of the added "bar" section of their post-1942 roundels overlapping the invasion strips on the wings.

In most cases the stripes were painted on by the ground crews; with only a few hours' notice, few of the stripes were "masked". As a result, depending on the abilities of the "erks" (RAF nickname for ground crew), the stripes were often far from neat and tidy.

Operation Starkey

The stripes for this two-day deception operation in 1943 were black from the wing tip to a position on the wing where the chord is 5 feet, then four bands of alternating white and black. This was the same for the upper and lower surfaces. These were applied to all aircraft operating at low level. For single engine aircraft the stripes were 18 inches in width. For twin engine aircraft, including the Westland Whirlwind, the stripes were 24 inches in width.

Hawker Typhoon

An earlier use of black and white bands was on the Hawker Typhoon and early production Hawker Tempest Mark Vs. The aircraft had a similar outline when seen from above and below to the Focke-Wulf Fw 190 and the bands were added to aid identification in combat. The order was promulgated on 5 December 1942. At first they were applied by unit ground crews, but they were soon being painted on at the factory. Four  black stripes separated by three  white, underwing from the wingroots. From early 1943 the Typhoons also had a yellow,  stripe on each of the upper wings, centred on the inner cannon. All of these markings were officially abandoned 7 February 1944.

Luftwaffe's Jagdverband 44

The late-war specialized all-jet Luftwaffe fighter squadron, Jagdverband 44, possessed a number of Fw 190 D piston-engined fighters to protect their units' Messerschmitt Me 262 jet fighters during the jets' takeoff and landing operations, as the jets were most vulnerable to Allied piston-engined fighter attack at those times. The Fw 190D aircraft of this so-called Platzschutzstaffel (airfield protection squadron) used a color scheme featuring solid red-painted areas under the wings and around the rear fuselage areas, within which narrow white stripes running fore-to-aft under the wings and "vertically" around the fuselage areas were painted, to identify them as "friendly" Luftwaffe fighters.

This was done for similar reasons as the "invasion stripes" had been used in Operation Overlord ten months earlier over Normandy. The Staffel was nicknamed Die Papagei-Staffel ("The Parrot squad") - it is not known, however, if the earlier use of Würger (which translates as "shrike" in English) by the Focke-Wulf aircraft firm itself for its original Fw 190A radial-engined initial subtype had any bearing on the JV 44 unit's Platzschutzstaffel nickname.

Cold war

Korea

Invasion stripes were re-introduced on British and Australian Fleet Air Arm aircraft operating during the Korean War in 1950.
Similar stripes were also used early in the war on F-86 Sabres of the 4th Fighter Interceptor Wing as a deviation from the standard yellow stripes.

Suez
The stripes were used again by the Royal Air Force, the Royal Navy's Fleet Air Arm, the French Naval Aviation and the French Air Force during the Suez operation of 1956, mostly to distinguish UK and French aircraft from Egypt's British-made planes. Single-engined aircraft had yellow/black/yellow/black/yellow stripes one foot wide; multi-engined aircraft had the same pattern with  stripes. Israel, who was a co-belligerent with Britain and France, did not paint Suez Stripes on their aircraft.

See also
 Identification friend or foe
 Combat Identification Panel
 Nelson Chequer, early 19th-century identification pattern
 United Nations Honour Flag
 Z (military symbol), symbols serving a similar purpose during the 2022 Russian invasion of Ukraine

References

External links

 
 
 
 

Military aviation
Operation Overlord
Aircraft markings